South Fork Little Snake River is an  tributary of the Little Snake River in Routt County, Colorado.  It flows north from a source in Routt National Forest near Steamboat Lake State Park to a confluence with the Little Snake River.

See also
 List of rivers of Colorado
 List of tributaries of the Colorado River

References

Rivers of Colorado
Rivers of Routt County, Colorado
Tributaries of the Colorado River in Colorado